The Church Body of Christ – Filipinista (Cebuano: Iglesia ang Lawas ni Kristo-Filipinista), simply known as CBCF or Filipinista, is an independent Christian religious organization that originated in the Philippines, particularly on the island of Mindanao, and was organized by His Eminence Reverend Lucilo G. Miñoza, a former IFI Priest assigned in Pagadian, Zamboanga del Sur. Its schism from Iglesia Filipina Independiente (IFI) was proclaimed in 1966 due to doctrinal positions and its quest to find the real church that Jesus Christ founded. The Church Body of Christ – Filipinista is not in communion with the Iglesia Filipina Independiente or any other religious denomination.

Its central office is located at the Chapel of the Holy Child Jesus in Brgy. Kitabog, Titay, Zamboanga Sibugay.

Naming of the Church 

The name Church Body of Christ is the true church founded by Jesus Christ in the year 30-33 AD. "Filipinistas" believe that this is the fulfillment of the word of God written from the book of Isiah 11:10-11 saying "...and in that day there shall be a root of Jesse, who shall stand as a banner to the people; for the Gentiles shall seek Him and his resting place shall be glorious. It shall come to pass in that day that the Lord shall set His hand again the second time to recover the remnant of His people who are left, from Assyria and Egypt, from Pathos and Cush, from Elam and Shinar, from Hamath and the islands of the sea." 

The Church named Church Body of Christ has its doctrinal position based on the Holy scripture written by God and the word Filipinista is added to represent the gentiles who are mostly Filipinos and the gentile Filipinos made member to the Church Body of Christ so that they may partake all glorious promises of Christ (Ephesians 3:4-6); the gentiles are called in one Body the Church (Colossians 3:15); the Church is the Body of Christ as preached by Apostle  Paul to gentile nation like the Philippines for the fullest of all (Ephesians 1:22-23); and Christ is the Head of the Church - the body of Christ (Colossians 1: 18) and He is the savior of the body which is the church (Ephesians 5: 22-23), this is the new living way (Hebrew 10:19-20).

History of the Church 

Church Body of Christ – Filipinista has its roots from the Iglesia Filipina Independiente (IFI) or Philippine Independent Church under the supervision of Monseigneur Gregorio Aglipay D.D who was the first Obispo Maximo of the Church, after the death of Msgr. Gregorio Aglipay, the Church was divided into two factions. The first one was under Msgr. Santiago Fonacier who created the Independent Church of Filipino Christians ( ICFC ), second was Msgr. Isabelo de los Reyes Jr. of the Philippine Independent Church ( PIC ). During the breakaway, the Bishop of Western Mindanao Msgr. Lucilo G. Miñoza D.D who was under the faction of Msgr. Santiago Fonacier made painstaking study of the Holy Scripture and made months of fasting asking the Lord God about his true Church. Through his vision the Lord revealed to Him the only one Church which his Body and after then he made it known to the Filipinos the Church named Church Body of Christ- Filipinista because it originated in the Philippines. The Church has its rapid growth and planted many chapels, parishes and converted many Filipinos as well as  many young men into priesthood through the Biblical Doctrines of the Church.

Lucilo G. Miñoza 

Msgr. Lucilo G. Miñoza D.D was born on October 28, and was the organizer and the first Supreme Bishop of the Church who himself made an extreme effort to bring forth the will of God to all the believers of our Lord Jesus Christ. On March 17, 1966 he made it registered in the Securities and Exchange Commission in Pagadian City, Philippines for the legality of the Church. On his death he was succeeded by his son Msgr. Silverio Miñoza who was then made progress and reform of the Church. After the two terms of Msgr. Silverio Miñoza, which is equivalent for twelve years he died for an unknown sickness and was succeeded by his brother Rizaldo Miñoza who took office for only Six months due to peptic ulcer. And again was succeeded by his younger brother Msgr. Manuel Miñoza. During this time the Church form of Government was a monarch, by then a convention made by Council of Bishop of the Church to have a term of Office for every Six years.

Division of the Church 

In year 2000, the successor Msgr. Manuel Miñoza took office and was then expected to end his term in year 2006 but there was a conspiracy made by Msgr. Manuel Miñoza. His loyal followers change the Article V of the constitution of the Church that there should be an election for every six years and the conspiracy made will make his term into a lifetime. Moreover, the Church was then divided again into two factions headed by Msgr. Manuel Miñoza who administered the Church Body of Christ Incorporated ( C.B.C.I. ) and Bishop Edgardo F. Betita of the old Church Body of Christ-Filipinista, whom the factions of Msgr. Edgardo Betita continue to administer the Church based on the by laws that was made during the Convention of Council of Bishops.

New administration and present day CBCF 

On the year 2007, Msgr. Edgardo F. Betita the General Secretary and Vicar Bishop of the Church called an immediate election of Church officials and then elected Msgr. David G. Sebial Sr. as its primate.

The installation of the new primate of the Church had suffer debate and division from the members of the Church loyal to the C.B.C.I Primate Msgr. Manuel Miñoza, asking whether the C.B.C.F or the C.B.C.I is the Church organize by the late Msgr. Lucilo Miñoza. By that instance serious efforts were made to instill to the minds and hearts of the members that the Church Body of Christ-Filipinista is still the one Church organized by the late Msgr. Lucilo Miñoza whom the Lord revealed to him as the true Church. As years had passed, the Church stood still as a Church of God whom Filipino Christians made partake.

References

Sources
 Church Body of Christ – Filipinista at the Securities and Exchange Commission (SEC)

External links 

Religious schisms
Churches in Zamboanga del Sur
1966 establishments in the Philippines